Marec may refer to:

MAREC, a patent information query tool
Michigan Alternative and Renewable Energy Center
Pierre Marec (1759–1828), a French lawyer
 Marec, Belgian caricaturist for Dag Allemaal
Marec, a populated place in Kosovo

Breton-language surnames